Musumecia is a clitocyboid agaric fungal genus with a soft, pseudosclerotium-like base. A monotypic genus, it contains the single species Musumecia bettlachensis, from France. Phylogenetically, Musumecia bettlachensis is sister to Pseudoclitocybe and is tentatively classified in the Tricholomataceae. Although the type species was also named as new, it is likely that it has been previously described considering the long history of studies on mushrooms in France and Europe in general.

Etymology
The name Musumecia was named after Italian mycologist Enzo Musumeci.

See also
 List of Tricholomataceae genera

References

Fungi of Europe
Monotypic Agaricales genera